Forbidden Glacier is on the north slopes of Forbidden Peak, North Cascades National Park in the U.S. state of Washington. The glacier is separated by an arête from Boston Glacier to the east and south. Meltwaters from Forbidden Glacier flow into Moraine Lake.

See also
List of glaciers in the United States

References

Glaciers of the North Cascades
Glaciers of Skagit County, Washington
Glaciers of Washington (state)